Vadh is a Hindi psychological thriller film directed by Raj Bharat and starring Nana Patekar. and produced by Dilip Dhanwani. This film was released on 29 March 2002, under the banner of Megastar films.

Plot
Doctor Arjun Singh is a famous psychiatrist lives with his wife Jyoti and brother Vijay. Vijay is Police Officer loves Deepa. One rainy night a serial killer escapes from Arjun's hospital and the whole city is under threat. But no one is able to capture the killer. After the series of murder of young ladies, Vijay suspects one womanizer Aryan. Aryan is the best friend of Dr. Arjun.

Cast
 Nana Patekar as Dr. Arjun Singh
 Puru Raaj Kumar as Aryan
 Meghna Kothari as Deepa
 Anupama Verma as Jyoti
 Nakul Vaid as Vijay
 Raju Mavani as Serial killer
 Shweta Menon as Guest appearance
 Arun Bakshi as Deepa's father
 Sambhavna Sheth

Soundtrack
Music was composed by Vishal–Shekhar.

Reception
Taran Adarsh of IndiaFM gave the film 2 stars out of 5, writing ″On the whole, VADH is an engrossing murder mystery that should be appreciated by those who love films of this genre. However, the film needs to be promoted aggressively in order to carve a niche for itself in the face of heavy competition from other big releases.″

The film was unsuccesful at Box office.

References

External links
 

2002 films
2000s mystery thriller films
Indian mystery thriller films
2000s Hindi-language films
2002 psychological thriller films
Indian psychological thriller films
Indian serial killer films
Films scored by Vishal–Shekhar